Jason Long (born 12 July 1983) is a Filipino cricketer who plays for the Philippines cricket team. In March 2019, he was named in the Philippines squad for the Regional Finals of the 2018–19 ICC T20 World Cup East Asia-Pacific Qualifier tournament. He made his Twenty20 International (T20I) debut for the Philippines against Vanuatu on 23 March 2019.

References

External links
 

1983 births
Living people
Filipino cricketers
Philippines Twenty20 International cricketers
Place of birth missing (living people)